Tiger Smalls (born Priest George Youngs Smalls on March 2, 1969) is a professional American boxing trainer who formerly held the World Boxing Organization Inter-Continental Featherweight title and North American Boxing Organization Featherweight title, as well as the Universal Boxing Association world featherweight title.

Early life 
Smalls spent his early years in the training camp of Muhammad Ali in Deer Lake, Pennsylvania and was featured in Jet magazine in 1973 at age three. He gained some minor celebrity for a photograph where Ali grimaces from one of young Smalls' punches.

Career 
Smalls was a standout amateur with a reported record of 92-11. With fast hands and feet and better than average power, Smalls is reported to have won several amateur titles in the Junior Olympics, Silver Gloves, the New York Golden Gloves, the Diamond Gloves, and the Amateur Athletic Union. He and also several military titles while serving in the U.S. Navy, including the 1988 All-Armed Forces bantamweight championship.

Smalls began his pro career on March 30, 1993. He became the Universal Boxing Association World Featherweight Champion in 1997 by knocking out Tony Green in the first round, and claimed the California State Featherweight title in 2002 by defeating Roger Medal with a technical knockout in the second round. Smalls earned the World Boxing Organization Inter-Contintental Featherweight title in 2003 by defeating Christian Favela. The following year, he defeated Alvin Brown for the North American Boxing Organization Featherweight Championship.

Smalls was inducted into the California Boxing Hall of Fame in October 2013.

Controversy

Controversy dogged Smalls throughout his career. Smalls upset the boxing establishment when he appeared in the February 2005 issue of High Times magazine, posing for a photo wearing his belts and holding a marijuana bud. The article quoted him as saying that he regularly smoked marijuana during training.  Later that year, he angered ESPN when he showed up to defend his NABO featherweight title bearing a temporary tattoo for Golden Palace, the online casino.

Personal life
Tiger Smalls trains his son Prince Tiger Smalls and mentors students and fighters at the San Diego Combat Academy.

San Diego Mayor Bob Filner presented Smalls with the key to the City of San Diego on March 2, 2013.

Professional boxing record 

|-
| style="text-align:center;" colspan="7"|21 Wins (9 knockouts, 12 decisions), 16 Losses (14 decisions, 2 TKO), 1 Draw
|-  style="text-align:center; background:#e3e3e3; background:#e3e3e3;"
| style="border-style:none none solid solid; "|Res.
| style="border-style:none none solid solid; "|Opponent
| style="border-style:none none solid solid; "|Type
| style="border-style:none none solid solid; "|Date
| style="border-style:none none solid solid; "|Location
| style="border-style:none solid solid solid; "|Notes
|- style="text-align:center;"
| Loss
| Juan Castaneda Jr.
| Decision 
| 
| Align=left| Santa Ynez, CA
| Align=left|
|- style="text-align:center;"
| Loss
| Vasyl Tarabarov
| Decision 
| 
| Align=left| Hoffman Estates, IL
| Align=left|
|- style="text-align:center;"
| Loss
| Nick Casal
| Decision 
| 
| Align=left| Santa Ynez, CA
| Align=left|
|- style="text-align:center;"
| Loss
| Vicente Escobedo
| Decision 
| 
| Align=left| Arco Arena, Sacramento, CA
| Align=left|
|- style="text-align:center;"
| Loss
| Castulo Gonzalez
| Decision 
| 
| Align=left| Boston, MA
| Align=left|
|- style="text-align:center;"
| Win
| Pete Frissina
| Decision 
| 
| Align=left| Tampa, FL
| Align=left|
|- style="text-align:center;"
| Loss
| Francisco Lorenzo
| Decision 
| 
| Align=left| American Airlines Arena, Miami, FL
| Align=left|
|- style="text-align:center;"
| Loss
| Elio Rojas
| TKO
| 
| Align=left| Madison Square Garden New York, NY
| Align=left|
|- style="text-align:center;"
| Loss
| Juan Ruiz
| Decision 
| 
| Align=left| Lancaster, CA
| Align=left|WBO-NABO junior featherweight title.
|- style="text-align:center;"
| Loss
| Marcos Ramirez
|| Decision 
| 
| Align=left| Kansas City, MO
| Align=left|
|- style="text-align:center;"
| Win
| Alvin Brown
|| Decision 
| 
| Align=left| Kansas City, MO
| Align=left|
|- style="text-align:center;"
| Win
| Anthony Martinez
| Decision 
| 
| Align=left| Burbank,CA
| Align=left|WBO-INC featherweight title defense.
|- style="text-align:center;"
| Win
| Ramon Valle
| Decision 
| 
| Align=left| Burbank, CA
| Align=left|WBO-INC featherweight title defense.
|- style="text-align:center;"
| Loss
| Ismael Gonzalez
| Decision 
| 
| Align=left| Montobello, CA
| Align=left|
|- style="text-align:center;"
| Win
| Pedro Mora
| Decision 
| 
| Align=left| Montobello, CA
| Align=left|
|- style="text-align:center;"
| Win
| Cristian Favela
| Decision 
| 
| Align=left| City of Industry, CA
| Align=left|
|- style="text-align:center;"
| Win
| Roger Medal
| TKO
| 
| Align=left| Burbank, CA
| Align=left|
|- style="text-align:center;"
| Win
| Mario Camarena
| Decision 
| 
| Align=left| Montebello, CA
| Align=left|
|- style="text-align:center;"
| Win
| Artur Petrosyan
| Decision 
| 
| Align=left| Inglewood, CA
| Align=left|
|- style="text-align:center;"
| Loss
| Marcos Licona
| Decision 
| 
| Align=left| Irvine, CA
| Align=left|
|- style="text-align:center;"
| Loss
| James Armah
| TKO
| 
| Align=left| Irvine, CA
| Align=left|California State Featherweight title.
|- style="text-align:center;"
| Win
| Roger Medal
| Decision 
| 
| Align=left| Anaheim, CA
| Align=left|California State featherweight title. 
|- style="text-align:center;"
| Win
| Eddie Croft
| KO
| 
| Align=left| Monterey, CA
| Align=left|
|- style="text-align:center;"
| Win
| Fernando Trejo
| Decision 
| 
| Align=left| Inglewood, CA
| Align=left|
|- style="text-align:center;"
| Loss
| Marcos Licona
| Decision 
| 
| Align=left| Irvine, CA
| Align=left|
|- style="text-align:center;"
| Win
| Tony Green
| TKO
| 
| Align=left| Pikeville, KY
| Align=left|Universal Boxing Association world featherweight title.
|- style="text-align:center;"
| Loss
| Danny Bostic
| Decision 
| 
| Align=left| St. Louis, MO
| Align=left|
|- style="text-align:center;"
| Win
| Frankie Banda
| KO
| 
| Align=left| Anaheim, CA
| Align=left|
|- style="text-align:center;"
| Loss
| Sergio Sanchez
| Points
| 
| Align=left| Woodland Hills, CA
| Align=left|
|- style="text-align:center;"
| Win
| Gary Adkins
| KO
| 
| Align=left| Asheville, NC
| Align=left|
|- style="text-align:center;"
| Win
| Olegario DeLeon
| TKO
| 
| Align=left| Woodland Hills, CA
| Align=left|
|- style="text-align:center;"
| Win
| James McCloskey
| TKO
| 
| Align=left| Latham, NY
| Align=left|
|- style="text-align:center;"
| Win
| Jimmy Navaro
| TKO 2nd
| 
| Align=left| Inglewood, CA
| Align=left|
|- style="text-align:center;"
|style="background:#abcdef;"|Draw
| Oscar Zamora
| Points
| 
| Align=left| Inglewood, CA
| Align=left|
|- style="text-align:center;"
| Win
| Thomas Stiltner
| KO
| 
| Align=left| Asheville, NC
| Align=left|
|- style="text-align:center;"
| Win
| Hilario Guererro
| Points
| 
| Align=left| Inglewood, CA
| Align=left|
|- style="text-align:center;"
| Win
| Oscar Aguilar
| KO
| 
| Align=left| Tijuana, Mexico
| Align=left|
|- style="text-align:center;"
| Loss
| Richard Thiele
| Points
| 
| Align=left| San Diego, CA
| Align=left|
|- style="text-align:center;"

References

External links
Tiger Smalls Official Site

1969 births
Living people
Super-featherweight boxers
Featherweight boxers
Super-bantamweight boxers
Boxers from California
Boxers from New York City
American boxing trainers
American male boxers
African-American boxers
21st-century African-American people
20th-century African-American sportspeople